"Si Supieras" (English: "If You Knew") is a song by Puerto Rican rapper and singer Daddy Yankee and Puerto Rican duo Wisin & Yandel, released on June 28, 2019 by El Cartel Records. The track was written by Daddy Yankee, Wisin, Yandel, Rafael Pina, Eric "Lobo" Rodríguez, Juan "Gaby Music" Rivera, Francisco "Luny" Saldaña, and Marco "Tainy" Masis, and was produced by Dominican producer Luny and Puerto Rican producer Tainy.

Background and release

"Si Supieras" was written by Daddy Yankee, Wisin, Yandel, Rafael Pina, Eric "Lobo" Rodríguez, Juan "Gaby Music" Rivera, Francisco "Luny" Saldaña, and Marco "Tainy" Masis, and was produced by Daddy Yankee's and Wisin & Yandel's longtime collaborators Luny and Tainy. Luny, as member of the Dominican production duo Luny Tunes, has worked with both acts on "Mayor Que Yo" (2005), "Noche de Entierro" (2006), and "Mayor Que Yo 3" (2015). He has also produced various songs by Daddy Yankee, including "Gasolina" (2004), "Lo Que Pasó, Pasó" (2004) and "Rompe" (2005), as well as the majority of Wisin & Yandel's album Pa'l Mundo (2005), including the singles "Rakata" and "Llamé Pa' Verte". Puerto Rican producer Tainy took part on the production of every studio album by Wisin & Yandel since Pa'l Mundo and won a Latin Grammy Award for Best Urban Song with them for "Abusadora" in 2009.

"Si Supieras" was announced by Daddy Yankee through social media on June 25, 2019, showing a brief trailer of the music video and posting that the song would be released on June 28. On June 27, Daddy Yankee posted a 45-second preview of the track featuring Yandel's vocals.

"Si Supieras" is the ninth collaboration between Daddy Yankee and Wisin & Yandel, following other singles including "No Me Dejes Solo" (2004), "Mayor Que Yo" (2005), "Noche de Entierro" (2006), "Mayor Que Yo 3" (2015), and "Todo Comienza en la Disco" (2018).

Wisin described "Si Supieras" as a romantic song, similar to "No Me Dejes Solo" from Daddy Yankee's album Barrio Fino. He stated that the track was recorded in response to "millions of petitions" from their fans on social media. Daddy Yankee referred to the collaboration as "gold school".

Music video
The music video for "Si Supieras" was directed by Venezuelan director Nuno Gomes, who had previously worked with Daddy Yankee on "Andas En Mi Cabeza" (2016) and "La Rompe Corazones" (2017) and also with Wisin & Yandel on "Duele" (2019). The official music video on YouTube was released on Daddy Yankee's channel on June 28, 2019. It has received over eight million views as of June 30, 2019. The clip was nominated for a Latin American Music Award for Favorite Video at the 5th Latin American Music Awards.

Credits and personnel
Credits adapted from Tidal.

Eric Rodríguez "Lobo" – songwriting
Marco Masis "Tainy" – songwriting, producer
Rafael Pina – songwriting
Juan Rivera "Gaby Music" – songwriting
Francisco Saldaña "Luny" – songwriting, producer
Wisin – songwriting, vocals
Yandel – songwriting, vocals
Daddy Yankee – songwriting, vocals

Charts

Weekly charts

Year-end charts

Certifications

See also
List of Billboard number-one Latin songs of 2019

References

2019 songs
2019 singles
Daddy Yankee songs
Wisin & Yandel songs
Songs written by Daddy Yankee
Spanish-language songs
Songs written by Wisin
Songs written by Yandel
Songs written by Francisco Saldaña
Songs written by Tainy
Songs written by Rafael Pina